National Route 299 is a national highway of Japan connecting Chino, Nagano and Iruma, Saitama in Japan, with a total length of 189.3 km (117.63 mi).

References

National highways in Japan
Roads in Gunma Prefecture
Roads in Nagano Prefecture
Roads in Saitama Prefecture